Farm to Market Road 171 (FM 171) is a farm to market road in Wichita and Clay counties, Texas.

Route description
FM 171 begins in Wichita Falls at an intersection with  Bus. US 287 north of the Wichita River. The route travels east on Lincoln Street to  SH 240. These two routes are concurrent northbound along King Boulevard before FM 171 turns back to the northeast along Jefferson Street. In the outskirts of Wichita Falls, FM 171 intersects  FM 1740 and then  FM 890, which provides access to Sheppard AFB. From here, the roadway is known as the Upper Charlie Road (as opposed to FM 1740, referred to as Lower Charlie Road or simply Charlie Road). The route crosses the Wichita–Clay county line and meanders through the farming areas of Clay County. It intersects  FM 1177 and then  FM 2393 near Thornberry. The highway turns to the east, crossing  FM 810 south of the community of Charlie. FM 171 then enters Byers, where it has a brief concurrency with  SH 79 through downtown, before it resumes its journey eastward. The roadway then turns southward, roughly paralleling the Red River and the Oklahoma state line, before FM 171 reaches its eastern terminus at  FM 2332.

FM 171's roadway is generally two-lane and shoulderless, except for the section in the Wichita Falls metropolitan area (from its western terminus to its junction with FM 890) and during its concurrency with SH 79 in Byers.

History
FM 171 was first commissioned in Clay County on June 11, 1945. Its original designation was from Byers across  SH 148 south of Charlie to Wichita Falls. On November 7, 1958, US 287 was rerouted in downtown Wichita Falls, and the FM 171 designation was extended along Lincoln Street to its current western terminus. The eastern terminus was extended to the south, first  to a county road on May 2, 1962, and then  to its current location at FM 2332 on June 1, 1965.

On June 27, 1995, the section from the eastern terminus at US 287 Bus. to the intersection with FM 890 was transferred to Urban Road 171 (UR 171). The designation of the section reverted to FM 171 with the elimination of the Urban Road system on November 15, 2018.

Major intersections

Notes

References

0171
Transportation in Clay County, Texas
Transportation in Wichita County, Texas